Yuriy Mykolayovych Voynov (29 November 1931 – 22 April 2003) was a Soviet and Ukrainian football player and manager.

Honours
 1960 European Nations' Cup Winner
 Soviet Top League Winner: 1961
 Selected to the 1958 FIFA World Cup team of the tournament
 Ballon d'Or 12th: 1959

International career
He earned 23 caps for the USSR national football team, and represented the country in the 1958 FIFA World Cup and the 1960 European Nations' Cup, where the USSR were crowned the first ever European champions. Also, he was listed as one of the best XI after the 1958 World Cup by Dr. Friedebert Becker.

In 1956 Voinov played couple of games for Ukraine at the Spartakiad of the Peoples of the USSR.

References

External links

Profile 

1931 births
People from Korolyov, Moscow Oblast
2003 deaths
Burials at Baikove Cemetery
Soviet footballers
Ukrainian football managers
Soviet football managers
Soviet Union international footballers
1958 FIFA World Cup players
1960 European Nations' Cup players
UEFA European Championship-winning players
Soviet Top League players
FC Zenit Saint Petersburg players
FC Dynamo Kyiv players
FC Chornomorets Odesa managers
MFC Mykolaiv managers
FC Shakhtar Donetsk managers
FC Vorskla Poltava managers
FC Metalist Kharkiv managers
FC CSKA Kyiv managers
FC Temp Shepetivka managers
Ukrainian people of Russian descent
Association football midfielders